The FIFA World Cup Dream Team is an all-time FIFA World Cup all-star team published by FIFA in 2002 after conducting an internet poll of fans to select a World Cup dream team. Diego Maradona of Argentina received the most votes. More than one-and-a-half million fans worldwide voted in the poll, conducted by the official FIFA website, www.FIFAworldcup.com, with Maradona receiving 111,035 votes. Brazil's Pelé, who played for three World Cup-winning teams, won 107,539 votes and Zinedine Zidane, who scored twice for France in their 1998 triumph, came in third with 80,527.

It is an eleven-member side divided as one goalkeeper, three defenders, four midfielders, and three forwards (3–4–3 formation).

See also
FIFA World Cup All-Time Team
FIFA 100
World Team of the 20th Century

References

Dream Team
World Cup Dream Team
Lists of association football players